The 2006 Indian Wells Masters (also known as the Pacific Life Open for sponsorship reasons) was a joint ATP Tour and WTA Tour tournament that took place on the hard courts of the Indian Wells Tennis Garden in Indian Wells, California. It took place from March 6 to March 19. The event was part of the upper echelon of both the women's and men's tours, as part of the ATP Masters Series and the WTA Tier I events respectively.

Roger Federer won his third consecutive title at Indian Wells, a feat that no other player had achieved until this point.

Champions

Men's singles

 Roger Federer defeated  James Blake 7–5, 6–3, 6–0

Women's singles

 Maria Sharapova defeated  Elena Dementieva 6–1, 6–2

Men's doubles

 Mark Knowles /  Daniel Nestor defeated  Bob Bryan /  Mike Bryan 6–4, 6–4

Women's doubles

 Lisa Raymond /  Samantha Stosur defeated  Virginia Ruano Pascual /  Meghann Shaughnessy 6–2, 7–5

References

External links

Association of Tennis Professionals (ATP) tournament profile

 
Pacific Life Open
Pacific Life Open
2006
Pacific Life Open
Pacific Life Open